(stylized MOSAIC.WAV) is a Japanese moe-pop band from Akihabara, widely known for doing theme songs to eroge, they eventually began to produce their own original work in 2004. In an interview with JaME, Kayamori stated their name was chosen in connection to church windows, and that they believe that the name really represents colour and different passions. The band is named after the digital sound file format WAV. Their songs have also been used as opening songs for Sumomomo Momomo and Kyouran Kazoku Nikki.

MOSAIC.WAV is fronted by vocalist MI-KO, with keyboardist Susumu Kayamori and guitarist Masaya Koike backing her up.

They dubbed their own music as Akiba-Pop, J-pop covered by numerous Akihabara cultural references, this including fantasy anime and video game themes.

MOSAIC.WAV is currently active as a band.

In 2015, MOSAIC.WAV composed the soundtrack for the anime adaptation of School-Live!.

Discography

Singles
 Magical Hacker☆Kurukuru Risk (Magical Hacker☆くるくるリスク) (May 14, 2004)
 Kimi wa Nan Terabyte? (キミは何テラバイト?) (October 28, 2005)
 Megane de ne! (めがねでねっ！) (September 8, 2006)
 Kyun Kyun Panic (キュン・キュン・パニック) (August 23, 2006) (Mamotte! Lollipop ED Theme)
 Saikyou○×Keikaku (最強○×計画) (October 25, 2006) (Sumomo mo Momo mo OP1 Theme)
 Girigiri Kagaku Shoujo Falsie (ギリギリ科学少女ふぉるしぃ) (December 29, 2006)
 Setsujou! Hyakka Ryouran (切情！佰火繚乱) (January 24, 2007) (Sumomo mo Momo mo OP2 Theme)
 Katamichi Catchball (片道きゃっちぼーる) (July 25, 2007) (Potemayo OP Theme)
 Denou Kassen×Uju no Jin! (電脳合戦×うじゅの陣！) (October 20, 2007)
 Last Battle! Akibattler "μ" (ラストバトル！アキバトラー"μ") (February 1, 2008)
 Chousai Kenbo Sengen (超妻賢母宣言) (Kyouran Kazoku Nikki OP Theme) (April 23, 2008)
 SPAM Mailing Girl (迷惑メーリングGIRL) (August 15, 2008)
 Kodomosaic・Yamimosaic (こどもざいく・やみもざいく) (December 27, 2008)
 Otoko no Musume no Tobira (おとこの娘のトビラ) (December 29, 2009)
 Zen Sekai Teki Touchpanel (全世界的タッチパネル) (August 13, 2009)
 Nou・Nai・Sai・Sei ～ecphoric dance～ (脳・内・再・醒 ～ecphoric dance～) (September 15, 2010)
 H na Kuni no Kyouiku Jijou (Hな国の教育事情) (August 12, 2011)

Albums
 We Love "AKIBA-POP"!! (October 29, 2004)
 SPACE AKIBA-POP (January 20, 2006)
 Future-Fiction:AKIBA-POP!! (August 31, 2007)
 Amusement Pack (March 26, 2008)
 Superluminal Ж AKIBA-POP (April 15, 2009)
 Heartsnative (October 21, 2009)
 Ginyuu Planet ☆ AKIBA-POP (吟遊Planet☆AKIBA-POP) (March 3, 2011)
 AKIBA-POP√RECOLLECTION (November 23, 2011)
 Minna Miku Miku ni Shite Ageru ♪ ~Heartsnative2~ (みんなみくみくにしてあげる♪~Heartsnative2~) (November 7, 2012)
 Astronomical Φ AKIBA-POP!! (December 11, 2013)
 Transistor no Doukedan ~Heartsnative3~ (トランジスタの道化団～Heartsnative3～) (December 11, 2013)
 MOSAIC.lassic ~Futari no Happy☆Island~ (MOSAIC.lassic~ふたりのはっぴー☆あいらんど~) (January 30, 2015)
 Miracleluminal Mosaic.Live!! MOSAIC.WAV 15th Anniv. (October 18, 2018)
 MiracleluminalΣAKIBA-POP (October 18, 2018)
 AKIBA-POP И SCRIPTER ~MOSAIC.WAV GAME SONG COLLECTION~ (December 23, 2020)
 Quiet MOSAIC.LIVE ~Keep on the AKIBA-POP~ (2Discs) (October 31, 2021)
 Gacha Gacha Cute ・ Figu@Hensoukyoku [Variation] ~Figu@15th Anniv.~ (ガチャガチャきゅ〜と・ふぃぎゅ@変奏曲[ヴァリエーション]〜Figu@15th Anniv.〜 ) (January 28, 2022)

External links

 Official Website
 Sham Studio
 MOSAIC.WAV interview on Kochipan (in French)
 MOSAIC.WAV interview on denpanosekai.com (in English)
 MOSAIC.WAV interview on JaME World (in English)

References

Japanese pop music groups
Musical groups established in 2004
Musical groups from Akihabara
NBCUniversal Entertainment Japan artists
Anime musical groups